Pachyballus variegatus is a species of jumping spider in the genus Pachyballus found in Tanzania. The species was first described in 1925.

References

Salticidae
Spiders described in 1925
Spiders of Africa